Jerry G. Gaff is an American educational scholar. He is a fellow at the Association of American Colleges and Universities and has published numerous books on general education and liberal arts education. In 1987–88, he was acting president of Hamline University.

References

American educational theorists
Living people
Year of birth missing (living people)
Hamline University faculty
DePauw University alumni
Syracuse University alumni
Sonoma State University faculty
University of the Pacific (United States) faculty
Hobart and William Smith Colleges faculty
Academic staff of Leiden University